Steven Christopher Wilson (born August 24, 1994) is an American professional baseball pitcher for the San Diego Padres of Major League Baseball (MLB). He made his MLB debut in 2022.

Amateur career
Wilson attended Dakota Ridge High School in Littleton, Colorado. In 2012, as a senior, he went 7–1 with a 2.66 ERA while batting .462 with seven home runs. He was selected by the Philadelphia Phillies in the 35th round of the 2012 Major League Baseball draft, but did not sign and instead enrolled at Santa Clara University where he played college baseball.

Wilson redshirted his freshman year at Santa Clara in 2013. In 2017, he underwent Tommy John surgery, and was forced to redshirt once again. He returned to play in 2018 as a redshirt senior, pitching to a 4–1 record and a 3.07 ERA over 16 games (nine starts), striking out 58 batters over 44 innings. After the season, he was drafted by the San Diego Padres in the eighth round of the 2018 Major League Baseball draft, and signed for $5,000.

Professional career
After signing with the Padres, Wilson made his professional debut with the Lake Elsinore Storm of the Class A-Advanced California League, but after two games was reassigned to the Tri-City Dust Devils of the Class-A Short Season Northwest League. Over eight innings pitched between the two clubs, he compiled a 7.88 ERA. In 2019, Wilson returned to Lake Elsinore to begin the year before being promoted to the El Paso Chihuahuas of the Class AAA Pacific Coast League, with whom he finished the season. Over 42 relief appearances between the two clubs, Wilson went 3–3 with a 2.67 ERA, striking out 85 over 64 innings. He did not play a minor league game in 2020 due to the cancellation of the minor league season caused by the COVID-19 pandemic. That winter, he played in the Dominican Professional Baseball League (LIDOM). To begin the 2021 season, Wilson returned to El Paso. He was placed on the injured list in mid-May and was activated in early July. Over thirty relief appearances, Wilson went 4–0 with a 3.21 ERA and 71 strikeouts over 42 innings. He returned to LIDOM after the season.

On November 19, 2021, the Padres selected Wilson's contract and added him to the 40-man roster. He was named to the team's Opening Day roster to start the 2022 season. He made his MLB debut on April 9, throwing one scoreless inning of relief.

References

External links

1994 births
Living people
Sportspeople from Littleton, Colorado
Baseball players from Colorado
Major League Baseball pitchers
San Diego Padres players
Santa Clara Broncos baseball players
Tri-City Dust Devils players
Lake Elsinore Storm players
El Paso Chihuahuas players
Leones del Escogido players
Arizona Complex League Padres players
Eau Claire Express players